Slovene national phonetic transcription is a group of four closely-related and similar phonetic alphabets used to write pronunciations of Slovene and its dialects, as well as Alpine Slavic. The alphabet was first used by Fran Ramovš in 1937 to transcribe Freising manuscripts, and was later slightly changed to more closely resemble the International Phonetic Alphabet. The old transcription is called "Ramovš transcription" and the new one "the new Slovene national phonetic transcription" or "Logar transcription". From those transcriptions, "tonal transcription" (used for tonal orthography) and "non-tonal transcription" (used for non-tonal orthography), which also has a simplified form that can be implemented without changing the spelling of most of the words and only shows the accent ("Stress notation") were derived, although the ununified predecessors were already used before.

In dialectology, it is known as "national transcription", since it is the only appropriate way to write dialects.

Non-tonal and tonal transcription 

It is still debated whether formal Slovene is a tonal language or not, however non-tonal transcription is used more frequently than the tonal one. It can be used to fully transcribe a word, but its diacritical marks can be added to a normally-written word to only denote the stress and the length of the vowel, because the pronunciation of other letters can already be evident from the spelling of most words. However, this cannot be applied to loanwords or to words that already have diacritical marks. This transcription is commonly added to words in books that are pronounced differently, but written the same to differentiate between them, such as môra "a nightmare" and móra "(he) has to".

Tonal transcription differs from non-tonal only in diacritical marks.

Notes:

  is preferred to  if following the Jurgec vowel system.
  is in a word written with u only in some old Slavic words, such as  "moral" and is usually transcribed into IPA as [w], but the distinction between the semivowel and consonant is then lost, so u̯ʷ, or simply u̯ is favored.
 On computers,  can be used to represent .

Logar and Ramovš transcription 
The Logar transcription is the full new national phonetic transcription and the Ramovš transcription is the "old" one, both of which can also be used for all Slovene dialects and Alpine Slavic. Logar transcription was designed by Valentin Logar and used in his works. It was implemented mainly because Ramovš transcription was not standardized and to make national transcription more similar to the International Phonetic Alphabet. However, it failed to do that and both transcriptions are in use today.

The transcriptions used for written Slovene are a simplification of these two transcriptions; the letters stayed the same, apart from those added later, and the diacritical marks mimicked the ones from Ramovš transcription, but some were also changed and added.

The transcriptions really detail some sounds, and is therefore more appropriate to use for Slovene dialects than IPA and does not have a perfect IPA substitute for every letter.

Notes:

 Letters marked with * are not part of the standard transcription.
 IPA transcriptions followed by a question mark are presumed; there was not enough research done to fully determine the transcription.
 The IPA transcriptions given are exact. When writing pronunciation generally, not all diacritics have to be used.
 On computers,  can be used to represent .

References 

National_phonetic_transcription